Venedikt Viktorovich Yevladov (Orenburg Governorate — , Saint Petersburg) was an orthodox priest (father), an educator, a deputy of the Fourth Imperial Duma from Orenburg Governorate between 1912 and 1914. He had right political views, but had worked only two sessions in the Russian parliament.

Life and work
Venedikt Yevladov was born .

He graduated from the Troitsk Gymnasium. In 1886 he became a priest.

Deputy of the Fourth Imperial Duma from Orenburg Governorate between 1912 and 1914.

Literature 
 Николаев А. Б. Евладов Венедикт Викторович (in Russian) // Государственная дума Российской империи: 1906—1917 / Б. Ю. Иванов, А. А. Комзолова, И. С. Ряховская. — Москва: РОССПЭН, 2008. — P. 179. — 735 p. — .
 Евладов (in Russian) // Члены Государственной думы (портреты и биографии): Четвертый созыв, 1912—1917 г. / сост. М. М. Боиович. — Москва: Тип. Т-ва И. Д. Сытина, 1913. — P. 207. — LXIV, 454, [2] p. 
 Рожков В. Церковные вопросы в государственной думе. — Москва: Изд. Крутицкого подворья, 2004. — P. 346—347. — 560 p. —  (in Russian)

1861 births
1914 deaths
People from Bashkortostan
People from Birsky Uyezd
Russian Eastern Orthodox priests
Progressive Party (Russia) politicians
Members of the 4th State Duma of the Russian Empire
Burials in Kurgan Oblast